Waikiki Beach is a beach at Cape Disappointment, Washington.

According to a Moon Travel Guide of the Long Beach, Washington area, "tiny Waikiki Beach is a favorite local spot for picnics. The beach received its name when a Hawaiian sailor's body washed ashore here after his ship was wrecked in a failed attempt to cross the Columbia River bar in 1811. You can follow a trail uphill from Waikiki to the Lewis and Clark Interpretive Center, and then on to Cape Disappointment Lighthouse."
Visitors will often use the large piles of driftwood to build forts, so the beach is covered in them (as of 2020).Swimming is not encouraged as the tides are unpredictable and there is no lifeguard present.

References

External links

Beaches of Washington (state)
Landforms of Pacific County, Washington